Ben-Luca Moritz (born 12 April 2000) is a German footballer who plays as a centre back for Rot-Weiß Erfurt.

References

External links
 Profile on FuPa.net
 Profile on kicker.de
 

2000 births
Living people
People from Zwickau
Footballers from Saxony
German footballers
Association football defenders
FC Rot-Weiß Erfurt players
ZFC Meuselwitz players
3. Liga players
Regionalliga players